Limnia is a village in the Famagusta District of Cyprus, located just north of the city of Famagusta. It is under the de facto control of Northern Cyprus.

References

Communities in Famagusta District
Populated places in Gazimağusa District